The spot-necked bulbul (Alcurus tympanistrigus) is a species of songbird in the bulbul family, Pycnonotidae. It is found in Sumatra. Its natural habitats are subtropical or tropical moist lowland forest and subtropical or tropical moist montane forest. It is threatened by habitat loss. The spot-necked bulbul was originally described in the genus Ixos and later placed in Pycnonotus.  Alternate names for the spot-necked bulbul include the olive-crowned bulbul, olive-necked bulbul and small white-streaked bulbul.

References

spot-necked bulbul
Birds of Sumatra
spot-necked bulbul
Taxonomy articles created by Polbot
Taxobox binomials not recognized by IUCN